Lalita Yadav (born 22 April 1961) is a member of the Madhya Pradesh Legislative Assembly in India. She was elected from Chhatarpur seat in the 2008 Madhya Pradesh Legislative Assembly elections. She belongs to the Bharatiya Janata Party (BJP).

From 1997 to 2004 she was district president of BJP Mahila Morcha, and from 2000 to 2004 president of the municipal council of Chhatarpur. In 2007–08 she was a member of the Bundelkhand Development Authority Sagar. In 2007 she was vice president MP BJP Mahila Morcha.

In June 2018, she was reported to have organized a wedding ceremony between two frogs in order to appease the rain gods. This was attended by hundreds of people, further encouraging this superstition.

References
https://web.archive.org/web/20120402152614/http://mpvidhansabha.nic.in/aspfiles/13intromla.asp?consno=51

Living people
People from Chhatarpur
Madhya Pradesh MLAs 2008–2013
Bharatiya Janata Party politicians from Madhya Pradesh
21st-century Indian women politicians
21st-century Indian politicians
1961 births
Women members of the Madhya Pradesh Legislative Assembly